Bonneyville Mills is an unincorporated community in York Township, Elkhart County, Indiana.

History
Edward Bonney, the bounty hunter and amateur detective, from Hittsboro, Essex County, New York, founded Bonneyville, Indiana, and built a gristmill, known as Bonneyville Mill, in 1837, which became the town namesake.  Bonneyville would later, be renamed Bonneyville Mills. Bonneyville Mill was added to the National Register of Historic Places in 1976.

Geography

References

Unincorporated communities in Elkhart County, Indiana
Unincorporated communities in Indiana